Chinna Poove Mella Pesu is a 1987 Indian Tamil-language romantic drama film directed by Robert–Rajasekar. The film stars Prabhu, Ramki, Narmadha, Sudha Chandran and Sabitha Anand. It was released on 17 April 1987 and became highly successful at the box office. The film marked the debut of Ramki and composer S. A. Rajkumar.

Plot 

Raja, a clever student, challenges Rekha, a rich and arrogant girl, to become the number one student. She loses her challenge but she falls in love with Raja. David, a former student, is now an alcoholic. During his college days, he fell in love with Esther but Shanthi was in love with David. Michael, Esther's father, was against their love so he beat David to death and Esther then committed suicide. Later, David survived. David decides to help the young lovers and to fight against the heartless Michael.

Cast 
Prabhu as David
Ramki as Raja
Narmadha as Rekha
Sudha Chandran as Shanthi
Roshni as Anitha
Sabitha Anand as Esther
Shubha
Senthamarai as Michael
Chinni Jayanth as Arokiyam
Kumarimuthu as Arokiyam's father
Swaminathan as Boopathy
Annadurai Kannadhasan as Priest

Production 
Though Robert–Rajasekar wanted newcomers for the film, they yielded to the producer's wish to cast an established actor. R. Sarathkumar originally had a role, but was replaced by Prabhu.

Soundtrack 
The music was composed by S. A. Rajkumar in his debut. He also wrote the lyrics. Over one-and-a-half lakh cassettes were sold as of September 1987.

Reception 
On 1 May 1987, V. Krishnaswamy of The Indian Express said, "Chinna Poove Mella Pesu is one of the best releases of the season. It does have some contrived sequences, but they are contrived well, and firmly establish Robert–Rajasekar as technicians of calibre." Jayamanmadhan of Kalki wrote .

References

External links 
 

1980s Tamil-language films
1987 films
1987 romantic drama films
Films scored by S. A. Rajkumar
Indian romantic drama films